Greatest Hit (...And 21 Other Pretty Cool Songs) is a compilation album by American progressive metal band Dream Theater released in Australia on March 29, 2008, and by Rhino Records in the United States on April 1. The title alludes to their only top 10 radio hit, "Pull Me Under". It features three songs from their breakthrough album Images and Words remixed by Kevin Shirley: "Pull Me Under", "Take the Time", and "Another Day". It also features the song "To Live Forever", an Awake-era re-recording of the song from the Images and Words sessions (featured as a B-side of the single "Lie"), which was previously unreleased on a full-length album. Several single edits of popular Dream Theater songs are also featured on this compilation.

The songs have been divided in two discs: the first one, dubbed "The Dark Side", features heavy, metal-influenced songs, while the second one, entitled "The Light Side", spotlights the band's melodic side. The set spans the years from 1991 to 2005, therefore it doesn't include any songs from Dream Theater's debut album, When Dream and Day Unite, their A Change of Seasons EP (although it was released in 1995) or their 2007 release Systematic Chaos.

Then-drummer Mike Portnoy explained in the album's booklet that the selection of songs were carefully made to appeal both to new listeners and already existing fans by offering different versions of songs on other albums to "make the newcomer want to buy the albums from whence they came" and to "give different versions of songs already on other albums" to the current fan. He also suggests that a third disc should have been included called "The Epic Side".

Track listing

Disc one ("The Dark Side")

Disc two ("The Light Side")

Personnel
James LaBrie – vocals
John Petrucci – guitar, backing vocals
John Myung – bass
Mike Portnoy – drums, backing vocals
Jordan Rudess – keyboards (tracks 5–11 on disc one and tracks 6–11 on disc two)
Kevin Moore – keyboards (tracks 1–3 on disc one and tracks 1-4 on disc two)
Derek Sherinian – keyboards, backing vocals on "Peruvian Skies" and "Hollow Years"
Jay Beckenstein – saxophone on "Another Day" and "Through Her Eyes"
Theresa Thomason – additional vocals on "Through Her Eyes" and "The Spirit Carries On"

Song notes
 The versions of "As I Am" and the four songs originally released on Octavarium differ slightly from the original versions, although the album credits do not state this. "As I Am" omits the opening orchestral chord and the use of profanity, while the songs from Octavarium omit the sound effects that served as interludes between songs on the original album, for instance, the opening F note played on keyboard and one minute intro to "The Root of All Evil" is omitted and starts at exactly 1:00 into the song.
 On the album cover, the "s" in "Greatest" and "hit" in "Hit" are printed in a subtle shade of red, making the word "shit", as a remark on the band's known frustrations with the status of "Pull Me Under". The album artwork continues this theme, with the stain of seagull feces on an armchair printed with the Dream Theater logo.

Chart positions

References

2008 greatest hits albums
Dream Theater albums
Albums produced by Duane Baron
Rhino Records compilation albums